Francisco Gomes da Costa (25 February 1919 – 1987) was a Portuguese footballer who played as a forward.

Costa died in 1987.

References

External links 
 
 

1919 births
1987 deaths
Portuguese footballers
Association football forwards
Primeira Liga players
FC Porto players
Portugal international footballers